The Battle of Vidattaltivu was fought over the town of Vidattaltivu, Sri Lanka, by the 58 Division of the Sri Lankan Military and the Liberation Tigers of Tamil Eelam (LTTE). The battle took place on July 16, 2008, part of the Northern Theater of Eelam War IV during the Sri Lankan civil war. The 58 Division victory in the battle marked the first time the Army had been in control of the town in 21 years. According to the Sri Lankan Ministry of Defence, the town had been the primary base used by the LTTE for its maritime operations and had also served as their logistics hub, making the taking of the town by the Army a "fatal blow" to the LTTE.

See also 
 List of Sri Lankan Civil War battles

References 

Vidattaltivu
Vidattaltivu
2008 in Sri Lanka
July 2008 events in Asia